Hibbertia patens is a species of flowering plant in the family Dilleniaceae and is endemic to south-eastern Queensland. It is a much-branched shrub with hairy foliage, linear to oblong leaves and yellow flowers arranged singly in leaf axils with 12 to 26 stamens arranged around two carpels.

Description
Flowering mainly occurs from August to November.

Taxonomy
Hibbertia patens was first formally described in 2010 by Hellmut R. Toelken in the Journal of the Adelaide Botanic Gardens from specimens collected on Mount Maroon in 1973. The specific epithet (patens) means "open" or "spreading", referring to the hairs on the foliage.

Distribution and habitat
This hibbertia grows in rock crevices on Mount Maroon, Mount Barney and Mount Ernest in south-eastern Queensland at altitudes above .

Conservation status
Hibbertia patens is classified as of "least concern" under the Queensland Government Nature Conservation Act 1992.

See also
List of Hibbertia species

References

patens
Flora of Queensland
Plants described in 2010
Taxa named by Hellmut R. Toelken